Unconscious is a 2004 period comedy film directed by Joaquín Oristrell starring Leonor Watling and Luis Tosar, also featuring Mercedes Sampietro, Juanjo Puigcorbé, Núria Prims and Alex Brendemühl in supporting roles.

Set in 1913 Barcelona and displaying the popularization of the theories of psychoanalysis as a backdrop, the plot follows the pregnant wife of a renowned Freudian psychiatrist who enlists the help of her admiring brother-in-law to uncover the elaborate mystery of why her husband ran away from home. The more she digs for the truth about her husband, the more she discovers the unexpected lies surrounding her brother-in-law, her father, her sister, and herself.

It is an international co-production by companies from Spain, Italy, Germany and Portugal.

Plot
In 1913 Barcelona, Alma, who is nine-months pregnant, returns home one day to find her husband, Leon, an eminent psychiatrist, about to flee their home and his practice. He has come back from a session with Dr. Freud in Vienna that has left him distraught. Left to have her baby alone, the witty and beautiful Alma enlists the help of her sister's husband – also a psychiatrist - the dispassionate, repressed Salvador, to help her solve the mystery of Leon's sudden departure. Ignoring his better judgment, Salvador agrees to help her, even though he sees it could be trouble for him with his prim, frigid wife, Olivia, Alma's sister.

There is a sibling rivalry between Alma and Olivia that is shared by their husbands. Olivia is jealous of her feminist sister as the favorite of their father, Dr. Mira, the pompous chief of staff in the hospital where both Leon and Salvador have their practice. Helping her father, Alma serves as translator in a lecture by Dr. Alois Alzheimer – who is unable to remember anything.

The beautiful Alma is as free-spirited as Salvador is uptight. Helping her, Salvador quickly runs into trouble. After an accidental self-hypnosis, he confesses that he is deeply in love with Alma, and that he married her sister, the ostensibly sexually inhibited Olivia, only to be near her. Still under hypnosis, traumatized by comments made by his wife regarding the size of his member, he exposes himself in a public place and his father-in-law fires him from his job.

A trail of clues initially indicates that Leon's disappearance may be connected to the concealment of embarrassing revelations about the sex life of the King of Spain, Alfonso XIII. Hints also led them to the back room of a barn that serves as a hide-out for making pornographic films. They also visit a deranged woman in a mad-house, a cross-dressing club and a high-class bordello, led all the while by clues contained in Leon's thesis: a detailed journal of his psychoanalytic sessions with four women he is treating for “hysteria”: a psychotic woman who tried to murder her husband; an actress with a persecution complex; a woman with a serious crisis concerning her sexual identity; and a stranger who has discovered a terrible secret about her past.

Salvador and Alma's investigation reveals a series of outrageous secrets. These include that Olivia has been living a secret life, going to a transvestite club. She has a lesbian lover and plans to leave her husband. Alma's alcoholic housekeeper, the unsympathetic Senora Mingarro, turns out to be Leo's biological mother, the result of a torrid affair with Dr. Mira, which makes Alma and Leon's marriage an incestuous union. The sudden reappearance of Leon only complicates things further.

Eventually they all attend a distinguished gathering in honor of Dr. Freud, who has come to Barcelona to discourse on his new book, “Totem and Taboo.”  Since Leon attributes all of his problems to Dr. Freud's theories on sexuality, he plans to kill him. However, the fall of a big chandelier aborts the assassination attempt. Leon and Dr. Mira die as a result of the accident with the chandelier. Olivia leaves for Paris where she wants to have a freer life with her lesbian lover. Alma gives birth to a baby boy. She realizes that she has fallen in love with Salvador and they become a happy couple.

Cast

Production 
A joint Spanish/Italian/German/Portuguese co-production, the film was produced by Tornasol Films and Messidor Films in co-production with EMC Asset Management,  and Classic, with the participation of TVE, Canal+, Eurimages, Televisió de Catalunya, ICEC and ICAA. Gerardo Herrero is credited as producer whereas Mariela Besuievski and Marta Esteban are credited as executive producers.

Release 
Distributed by Alta Classics, the film was theatrically released in Spain on 27 August 2004.

The film was released on DVD in the United States under the title Unconscious.

Accolades 

|-
| rowspan = "5" align = "center" | 2005 || rowspan = "5" | 19th Goya Awards || Best Original Screenplay || Joaquín Oristrell, Teresa de Pelegrín, Dominic Harari ||  || rowspan = "5" | 
|-
| Best Supporting Actress || Mercedes Sampietro || 
|-
| Best Original Score || Sergio Moure || 
|-
| Best Costume Design || Sabine Daigeler || 
|-
| Best Makeup and Hairstyles || Karmele Soler, Paco Rodríguez || 
|}

See also 
 List of Spanish films of 2004
 List of Italian films of 2004
 List of Portuguese films of 2004

References 
Citations

Bibliography

External links 
 Inconscientes at ICAA's Catálogo de Cinespañol
 

2004 films
Spanish comedy films
2000s Spanish-language films
2004 drama films
Films set in Barcelona
Films set in 1913
Films about psychoanalysis
2000s Spanish films
2000s Italian films
Tornasol Films films